Hew Thomson Fraser (25 July 1877 – 11 August 1938) was a Scottish field hockey player and British Liberal Party politician. He was born in Glasgow.

In 1908, he competed in the 1908 Summer Olympics, he won the bronze medal as member of the Scotland Hockey team.

He moved to London in 1920. He worked as an Insurance Broker.

He was Liberal parliamentary candidate for the Wood Green Division of Middlesex from 1929 to 1938. He fought the 1929 General Election, coming second, pushing the Labour candidate into third place. 

Following the formation of the National Government in 1931, there was another General Election. As the Liberals and Conservatives were partners in that government, the Wood Green Liberal Association decided not to oppose the sitting Conservative MP. At the following General Election, after the Liberals had moved into opposition, Fraser again contested Wood Green for the Liberals, but this time finished third. 

After his death, his wife remained active for the Liberals in Wood Green.

References

External links
Hew Fraser's profile at databaseOlympics.com

External links
 

1877 births
1938 deaths
Scottish male field hockey players
Olympic field hockey players of Great Britain
British male field hockey players
Field hockey players at the 1908 Summer Olympics
Olympic bronze medallists for Great Britain
Olympic medalists in field hockey
Scottish Olympic medallists
Liberal Party (UK) parliamentary candidates
Medalists at the 1908 Summer Olympics
British sportsperson-politicians